Rosita Quinto Stecza (1925 – November 28, 2006), known by her screen name Rosa Mia, was an award-winning actress and one of the few female directors in the Philippines. She was known as the "Queen of Tearjerker Movies" for her work mostly on the drama genre typified in motherly roles. She died on November 28, 2006 at the age of 81 due to cardiac arrest.

Career
"Ka Oncha", as she is known among her colleagues from radio, started her career in the films of actor-producer Fernando Poe Sr. for his production company X'otic Films.  It was he who gave her screen name Rosa Mia in her first film, Dugo at Bayan (I Remember Bataan) in 1946. The film was also the first for Dolphy, the country's unequivocal King of Comedy.

Filmography

Actress

Director

References

External links

1925 births
2006 deaths
20th-century Filipino actresses
Filipino film actresses
Filipino film directors
Filipino women film directors